Joaquín Loyo-Mayo (August 16, 1945 – December 27, 2014) was a left-handed Mexican athlete who played amateur and professional tennis in the 1960s and 1970s.

Born in Veracruz, Mexico, Loyo-Mayo's playing career was coming to an end as the ATP rankings were coming into being. He achieved a ranking of world no. 99 in the rankings on April 12, 1976.

He won the singles title at Cincinnati in 1967, and was a doubles finalist in Cincinnati in 1975 and 1968.  He also reached the Round of 16 at Wimbledon in 1971, and the third round at the French Open and Wimbledon in 1970.

In November 1963, he represented his homeland in the  inaugural Games of the New Emerging Forces (GANEFO) in Jakarta. Partnering M.L. de Santiago, he won a silver medal in the men's doubles.

He represented Mexico in the Davis Cup, playing in 45 matches between 1964 and 1976.

He studied at the University of Southern California, earning a degree in marketing and winning the 1969 NCAA Men's Tennis Championship.

In 1989 he joined, as professional coach, Edgbaston Archery & Lawn Tennis Society in Birmingham, United Kingdom, the oldest lawn tennis club in the world.

References

External links
 
 
 

Mexican male tennis players
1945 births
Sportspeople from Veracruz
2014 deaths
USC Trojans men's tennis players
Tennis players at the 1968 Summer Olympics
Tennis players at the 1967 Pan American Games
Pan American Games medalists in tennis
Pan American Games silver medalists for Mexico
20th-century Mexican people